The 2013–14 UTEP Miners women's basketball team represents the University of Texas at El Paso during the 2013–14 NCAA Division I women's basketball season. The Miners, led by 13th year head coach Keitha Adams, play their home games at the Don Haskins Center and were members of Conference USA. They finished the season with a record of 29–8 overall, 12–4 in C-USA play for a third-place finish. They lost in the semifinals in the 2014 Conference USA women's basketball tournament to Southern Miss. They were invited to the 2014 Women's National Invitation Tournament which they defeated Arkansas State in the first round, St. Mary's in the second round, Colorado in the third round, Washington in the quarterfinals and South Dakota State in the semifinals before losing to Rutgers in the championship game.

Roster

Schedule

|-
!colspan=9| Exhibition

|-
!colspan=9| Regular Season

|-
!colspan=9| 2014 Conference USA women's basketball tournament

|-
!colspan=9| 2014 Women's National Invitation Tournament

See also
2013–14 UTEP Miners basketball team

References

UTEP Miners women's basketball seasons
UTEP
2014 Women's National Invitation Tournament participants